The Northern Ireland Open  is a darts tournament that has been held since 2003.

List of tournaments

Men's

Women's

Boys

Girls

Tournament records

 Most wins 3:  Fred McMullan. 
 Most Finals 4:  Darryl Fitton.
 Most Semi Finals 4:  Darryl Fitton,  Gary Robson.
 Most Quarter Finals 4:  Darryl Fitton, Gary Anderson, Gary Robson.
 Most Appearances 6:  Martin Atkins.
 Most Prize Money won £3,200:  Glen Durrant.
 Youngest Winner age 16:   Michael van Gerwen. 
 Oldest Winner age 50:  Tony O'Shea.

See also
List of BDO ranked tournaments
List of WDF tournaments

References

External links

1985 establishments in Northern Ireland
Darts tournaments